Son of the Brush is a 2020 memoir by Tim Olsen about his life as the son of artist John Olsen. It was published in Australia and New Zealand by Allen & Unwin. The book received positive reviews.

References

Further reading 

 
 

2020 non-fiction books
Australian memoirs
Books about artists
Allen & Unwin books